Nymphargus siren (common name: Rio Coca Cochran frog) is a species of frog in the family Centrolenidae, formerly placed in Cochranella.
It is found in Colombia, Ecuador, and Peru.
Its natural habitats are pre-montane forests near streams. It is threatened by habitat loss.

Adult males of Nymphargus siren measure  in snout–vent length. Snout is truncate and dorsal skin is shagreen with spinules.

References

siren
Amphibians of Colombia
Amphibians of Ecuador
Amphibians of Peru
Taxonomy articles created by Polbot
Amphibians described in 1973